Lâm Sơn may refer to several places in Vietnam, including:

, a rural commune of Lương Sơn District
, a rural commune of Chi Lăng District
Lâm Sơn, Ninh Thuận, a rural commune of Ninh Sơn District